Lassie ("girl" in the Scots language, from lass) is a fictional female collie dog character and the stage name of a line of male dogs who have played her.

Lassie may also refer to:

Works about the dog

Films
 Lassie (1994 film), an American film 
 Lassie (2005 film), a British film

Television
 Lassie (1954 TV series), an American series 1954–1973
 The New Lassie, a syndicated American series 1989–1991
 Lassie (1997 TV series), a Canadian-produced series 1997–1999
 Lassie (2014 TV series), an animated series 2014–2015 and 2020

Other media
 Lassie (manga), a 2001 Japanese manga series
 Lassie (radio program), an American program 1947–1950

Other uses
 "Lassie", a song by hide from Psyence, 1996
 Carlton Lassiter, nicknamed "Lassie", a fictional character in the TV series Psych
 Lassie Lou Ahern (1920–2018), American actress
 Lassie Goodbread-Black (1904–1996), American farmer and educator
 Lassie, a fictional toy character in the Wee Sing 1988 video: Grandpa's Magical Toys

See also 
 
 Lassy (disambiguation)
 Lassi (disambiguation)
 Lass (disambiguation)